The siege of Breteuil was the investment of the Norman town of Breteuil, held by partisans of Charles II, King of Navarre, by French forces. It lasted from April to about 20 August 1356. It was interrupted on 5 July when a small English army commanded by Henry, Earl of Lancaster relieved and resupplied it. The French king, John II, attempted to bring Lancaster to battle with the much larger French royal army, but Lancaster marched away and the attempt failed. John then renewed the siege of Breteuil.

The French force attracted great contemporary praise for its splendour and the high status of many of its participants, but it made little progress as the town was well garrisoned and had been left by Lancaster with food for a year. John attempted to mine under the walls, to no avail. Meanwhile, the Black Prince, the son and heir of the English King, had assembled an Anglo-Gascon army at Bergerac and marched into French-held territory, devastating the countryside as he went. At some point in August an unusually large mobile siege tower was pushed up to the walls of Breteuil and a large assault launched. The defenders set fire to the tower and repulsed the attack, inflicting many casualties. Taking Breteuil became a matter of prestige for John and he refused to take the army south to face the Black Prince. 

Eventually, some time around 20 August, John gave the garrison of Breteuil free passage to the Cotentin and a huge bribe in order to persuade them to vacate Breteuil. The French army promptly marched south as all available forces were concentrated at Chartres to oppose the Black Prince. John and his army pursued the Black Prince's force, cut off their retreat and forced it to battle at Poitiers. The French were defeated with heavy casualties and John was captured.

Background

Since the Norman Conquest of 1066, English monarchs had held titles and lands within France, the possession of which made them vassals of the kings of France. On 24 May 1337, following a series of disagreements between Philip VI of France and Edward III of England, Philip's Great Council in Paris agreed that the lands held by Edward III in France should be taken into Philip's direct control on the grounds that Edward III was in breach of his obligations as a vassal. This marked the start of the Hundred Years' War, which was to last 116 years.

In 1346  Edward led an army across northern France, defeating the French at the Battle of Crécy and successfully laying siege to the port of Calais. Following further inconclusive military manoeuvres by each side, and given that both sides were financially exhausted, on 28 September the Truce of Calais, intended to bring a temporary halt to the fighting, was agreed. This strongly favoured the English, confirming them in possession of all of their territorial conquests. It was to run for nine months to 7 July 1348, but was extended repeatedly over the years until it was formally set aside in 1355. The truce did not stop ongoing naval clashes between the two countries, nor small-scale fighting in Gascony and the Duchy of Brittany, nor occasional fighting on a larger scale.

A treaty ending the war was negotiated at Guînes and signed on 6 April 1354. The French king, now John II, decided not to ratify it and it did not take effect. The latest extension to the truce was due to expire on 24 June. It was clear that from then both sides would be committed to full-scale war. In April 1355 Edward and his council, with the treasury in an unusually favourable financial position, decided to launch offensives that year in both northern France and Gascony. John attempted to strongly garrison his northern towns and fortifications against the expected descent by Edward III, at the same time assembling a field army; after allocating garrisons the French field army was inadequate, largely due to lack of money to recruit more men.

Prelude

While French attention was focused on the north, Edward III's eldest son, Edward of Woodstock, later commonly known as the Black Prince, arrived in Bordeaux, the capital of English-held Gascony, in September 1355 accompanied by 2,200 English soldiers. During October and November 1355 an Anglo-Gascon force of between 5,000 and 6,000 men marched from Bordeaux  to Narbonne and back to Gascony. Known as the Black Prince's chevauchée, this march devastated a wide swathe of French territory and sacked many French towns. While no territory was captured, enormous economic damage was done to France; the modern historian Clifford Rogers concluded that "the importance of the economic attrition of the chevauchée can hardly be exaggerated." The English component resumed the offensive after Christmas to great effect, and more than 50 French-held towns or fortifications in south-west France were captured during the following four months. Several local lords went over to the English, bringing a further 30 fortified places with them.

Money and enthusiasm for the war were running out in France. The modern historian Jonathan Sumption describes the French national administration as "fall[ing] apart in jealous acrimony and recrimination". Much of the north of France was openly defying John and a contemporary chronicler recorded that "the King of France was severely hated in his own realm". The town of Arras rebelled and killed loyalists. The major nobles of Normandy refused to pay taxes. On 5 April 1356 several of these nobles were dining at the table of Charles, John's eldest son, the dauphin, when John arrived and arrested ten of the most outspoken; four were summarily executed. One of those imprisoned was the inveterately treacherous Charles II, King of Navarre, who was one of the largest landholders in Normandy. The Norman nobles who had not been arrested sent to Navarre for reinforcements and turned to Edward for assistance.

First siege

During April 1356 the French took control of most of Normandy and laid siege to those fortifications which refused to surrender.  The Cotentin area in the north-west was pro-Navarrese, but the French concentrated on mopping up Navarrese strongholds in central Normandy. Charles, who was also the duke of Normandy, took charge of suppressing these holdouts. The major Navarrese strongholds in central Normandy were Pont-Audemer, Breteuil, Tillières-sur-Avre and Évreux. The French King was at Chartres assembling an army with which to respond to whatever moves the English might make. An , a formal call to arms for all able-bodied males, was announced by the French on 14 May 1356. The response was unenthusiastic and the call was repeated in late May and again in early June. 

Évreux was the capital of Navarre's holdings in Normandy as Count of Évreux and Charles took personal command of its siege, ordering several assaults, which were unsuccessful. In early June another attack breached the walls and the defenders were forced back to the citadel, leaving the town in flames. A surrender of the citadel was negotiated, in exchange for granting the garrison, which included Navarre's senior councillors, free passage to Breteuil. The town of Pont-Audemer fell to a French force commanded by Robert de Houdetot, but as with Évreux the citadel held out. Houdetot ordered assaults on the citadel, which failed; so he drove mines towards its walls in an attempt to sap them. The third Navarrese-held town in central Normandy, Breteuil, was a walled town with a strong citadel, built some 300 years earlier. The town was prosperous, but as a fortification it was strategically unimportant. It was besieged by a large French force, but no siege works were undertaken against it.

Philip of Navarre, another younger brother of Charles of Navarre, took command of several adherents of his brother and withdrew to the northern Cotentin. From there he appealed to the English King for military assistance. Edward decided to back the Navarrese. He had been preparing an expedition to Brittany under Henry, Earl of Lancaster, as part of the War of the Breton Succession; Edward diverted this to Normandy to support the French rebels. On 18 June 1356 Lancaster arrived at St. Vaast la Hogue in the north-east Cotentin with 500 men-at-arms and 800 longbowmen. They were reinforced by 200 Normans under Philip of Navarre. The English commander Robert Knolles joined Lancaster in Montebourg with a further 800 men detached from English garrisons in Brittany. The historian Clifford Rogers suggests that these 2,300 men were reinforced by up to 1,700 men from Navarrese-held fortifications over the following month.

Relief

On 24 June the English set out from Montebourg, burning and looting their way through western Normandy. Lancaster's small army arrived at Pont-Audemer on the 30th. The town was close to falling, as the French had nearly succeeded in driving their mines under its walls. They fled on hearing of Lancaster's approach, abandoning their baggage and siege equipment. The English spent two days provisioning the town and filling in the French excavations. Detaching 100 men to reinforce the garrison, Lancaster marched south on 2 July, reaching Breteuil on the 5th. Its besiegers retired in good order, and it was resupplied sufficiently to stand a siege for a year.

The English continued their march on 4 July to Verneuil, seized it, looted it and took prisoner anyone who it was considered might be worth a ransom. The citadel held out until the 6th, when its defenders negotiated a surrender. The attack on Verneuil was probably motivated by the prospect of looting a rich town; no attempt was made to relieve Navarrese-held Tillières-sur-Avre,  to the east. The same day Vereuil's citadel fell, reports of the approach of the French army were being received. It was much stronger than the English force, with perhaps ten times the number of men. On the 7th Lancaster rested his men and horses, but they did so arrayed in battle order outside Verneuil in case of a French attack.

The French at Condé-sur-Iton also rested, having marched hard to get there in two days from Rouen; in addition John probably wished for all of his stragglers and detachments to join his army before offering battle. The French army, which Rogers describes as "vastly superior ... in numbers", halted 2 or 3 miles (3 to 5 km) away. John sent heralds to Lancaster inviting him to commit his force to a formal battle. Lancaster replied ambiguously, but John, convinced that Lancaster's main reason for landing in Normandy was to seek a battle, believed that an agreement had been reached and camped for the night. Attempting a pursuit was clearly hopeless, so the French returned to Breteuil and re-established their siege. A force was sent to Tillières-sur-Avre, which promptly capitulated.

Second siege

John took personal charge of this second siege, which commenced on 12 July. The royal army attracted great contemporary praise for its splendour and the high status of many of its participants, but it made little progress, as Breteuil was well garrisoned and had been left by Lancaster with food for a year. Numbers alone could not overcome its strong defences. John attempted to mine under the walls, something which Norman fortifications were frequently susceptible to; on this occasion it was to no avail.

Meanwhile, the Black Prince had assembled an Anglo-Gascon army at Bergerac and on 4 August it marched north 6,000 strong, devastating the countryside as it went. The French had been concerned regarding a possible offensive by the Black Prince since at least 26 July. At some point in August an unusually large belfry, or mobile siege tower, was pushed up to the walls of Breteuil and a large assault launched. The defenders set fire to the belfry and repulsed the attack. Sumption describes the French losses in this attack as "terrible" and the entire second siege as "a pointless endeavour". The modern historian Kenneth Fowler describes the siege as "magnificent but archaic".

Despite it being clear that Breteuil could be neither stormed nor starved, John felt unable to abandon the siege as this would undermine his prestige as a warrior-king. He declined to march against the Black Prince, declaring that the garrison of Breteuil posed a more serious threat. Eventually he had to give way to the pressure to do something to prevent the destruction being wracked in south-west France. Some time around 20 August he offered the garrison of Breteuil free passage to the Cotentin, a huge bribe, and permission to take their valuables and goods, in order to persuade them to vacate the town. The French army promptly marched south, as all available forces were concentrated against the Black Prince.

Aftermath
Philip of Navarre and Godfrey d'Harcourt (a prominent and influential Norman noble) acknowledged Edward III as king of France and did homage to him for their Norman lands. Lancaster moved on to Brittany with 2,500 men.

John assembled the royal army at Chartres and pursued the Anglo-Gascons under the Black Prince. He succeeded in cutting off their retreat and forced them to battle at Poitiers on 19 September. The French army was heavily defeated by the Black Prince's smaller force and John was captured, along with most of his court and much of the nobility of France. Charles of Navarre, who was imprisoned throughout the siege of Breteuil, was released on 9 November 1357 when a group of his partisans escaladed the castle where he was held, leading to further upheavals in the French government.

Notes, citations and sources

Notes

Citations

Sources

 
 
 
 
 
 
 
 
 
 

 
 
 

1356 in England
1350s in France
Breteuil
Conflicts in 1356
Military history of Normandy
History of Eure
Hundred Years' War, 1337–1360